The 2010 United States Senate election in Florida took place on November 2, 2010, concurrently with other elections to the United States Senate in other states, as well as elections to the United States House of Representatives and various state and local elections.

Incumbent Republican Senator Mel Martínez, who was elected in a very close race against Democrat Betty Castor with 49% of the vote in 2004, announced on December 2, 2008, that he would not run for re-election to a second term, then announcing on August 7, 2009, that he would resign prior to the end of his term. The governor of Florida, Republican Charlie Crist, was required to appoint a successor and he chose his former chief of staff, George LeMieux. LeMieux, a placeholder who did not run in the election, replaced Martínez in the Senate on September 10, 2009.

Crist publicly announced he was running for the seat in mid-2009. When he declared his candidacy, he received many Republican endorsements, including the National Republican Senatorial Committee, Martínez, and 2008 Republican presidential nominee John McCain. However, his support of the American Recovery and Reinvestment Act of 2009 hurt his popularity among conservatives, and Tea Party candidate Marco Rubio, the former Speaker of the Florida House of Representatives, surged in the polls. In April 2010, Crist announced he would drop out of the Republican primary and run as an Independent. The National Republican Senatorial Committee withdrew its endorsement of Crist and demanded a refund of its campaign funds that it provided for the Crist campaign. Rubio went on to win the Republican primary against only token opposition.

U.S. Representative Kendrick Meek was the first Democrat to declare his intention to run and he defeated billionaire businessman Jeff Greene in his party's primary. Also on the ballot were Alexander Snitker of the Libertarian Party, Bernie DeCastro of the Constitution Party, and five other independent candidates.

Polling initially showed Crist neck and neck with Rubio, but by the end of August Rubio opened up a solid and consistent lead. He was supported by Republican and some Independent voters whereas Democratic and other Independent voters were split between Crist and Meek. Rubio went on to win the election with 49% of the vote to Crist's 30% and Meek's 20%.

Background 

Republican Mel Martínez, the former United States Secretary of Housing and Urban Development, was elected to the Senate in 2004, defeating Democrat Betty Castor, the former president of the University of South Florida and former Florida Education Commissioner, by 82,663 votes, 49.4% to 48.3%. He succeeded retiring Democratic incumbent Bob Graham.

Throughout 2008, opinion polls found that Martínez was consistently unpopular with a plurality of Florida voters. Public Policy Polling surveys taken in June, July/August, and September 2008 found that his job approval rating was 23%, 24% and 23%, respectively, with 43%, 40% and 37%, respectively, disapproving of his job performance. A Quinnipiac University Polling Institute survey in November 2008 found him with a higher job approval rating, with 42% approving of his job performance, 33% disapproving and 25% unsure. However, the same survey also found that only 36% of Florida voters thought he deserved to be re-elected, compared to 38% who did not and 26% who were unsure. 36% also said that if the 2010 election were held on that day, they would vote for Martínez, while 40% said they would vote for his Democratic opponent, with 24% unsure. Furthermore, his personal approval rating was 31%, with 28% having an unfavourable opinion of him and 40% saying they had no opinion of him.

In head-to-head matches against specific Democratic opponents, the same Public Policy Polling surveys found Martínez tied with U.S. Representative Robert Wexler and trailing Chief Financial Officer of Florida Alex Sink, former senator Bob Graham, U.S. Representative Debbie Wasserman Schultz, U.S. Representative Allen Boyd and U.S. Representative Ron Klein, by margins of between 1 and 20 points. In its November 2008 ratings of the 2010 Senate elections, The Cook Political Report rated the Florida race as a "tossup" and various media outlets identified Martínez as one of the most vulnerable incumbent senators.

On November 25, 2008, Sink announced that she would soon make a decision about whether to run for re-election, for Governor or the U.S. Senate. Martínez was reported to be "planning" to run for re-election, but was not expected to make an official announcement until January 2009. On December 1, Sink announced that she would run for re-election rather than for the Senate. The following day, Martínez announced that he would not run for re-election, saying that he wanted to spend more time with his family.

Republican primary

Background 
Upon Martínez' announcement that he would not run for re-election, early speculation surrounded former Governor Jeb Bush. It was thought that if Bush decided to run, other potential Republican candidates would allow Bush to run uncontested. After consideration, Bush decided not to run. Other potential candidates included Florida Attorney General Bill McCollum, former Speaker of the Florida House of Representatives Marco Rubio, Florida Senate President Jeff Atwater, Florida House Majority Leader Adam Hasner, Orange County Mayor Rich Crotty and U.S. Representatives Vern Buchanan, Lincoln Díaz-Balart, Mario Díaz-Balart, Connie Mack IV and Adam Putnam. Florida Governor Charlie Crist was initially not thought likely to run, instead preferring to run for re-election. Mack and Rubio were thought the most likely to run, with both preparing their campaigns behind the scenes.

On January 28, 2009, McCollum announced that he would not run. On February 9, Joe Scarborough, a cable news host for MSNBC and former U.S. Representative from Florida, told the Sarasota Herald-Tribune that he may run for office again, and was considering running for the Senate. An MSNBC spokesman refuted the idea that Scarborough might run and the following day, Scarborough, while interviewing White House Press Secretary Robert Gibbs, dismissed the idea that he would run.

In early February, speculation increased that Charlie Crist was considering running and that Martínez, who had previously pledged to serve out the rest of his term, would resign. The possibility of Crist appointing himself to the Senate was ruled out by Jim Greer, the chairman of the Republican Party of Florida, but it was further speculated that Crist could also resign, allowing his Republican Lieutenant Governor, Jeff Kottkamp, to appoint Crist to the Senate. The race was essentially "frozen" as potential candidates waited for Crist to declare his intentions and almost immediately, he began to receive criticism from the right of the Republican Party. This dissatisfaction, which had begun soon after he was elected, "snowballed" when he began considering running for the Senate, centring on his perceived moderate positions, his environmental policies, his appointment of James E. C. Perry to the Supreme Court of Florida when conservatives favoured another candidate, his willingness to give President Obama "a shot", and his support of the American Recovery and Reinvestment Act of 2009.

On March 5, Rubio formed an exploratory committee to run for the Senate, though Rubio said that he would run for governor instead if Crist ran for the Senate, with Crist saying that he would make a decision at the end of the legislative session in May. However, towards the end of March, Rubio began openly criticising Crist for his support of the stimulus and expanded gambling.

In early April, Politico reported that Rubio was likely to stay in the Senate race even if Crist ran, following disapproval of Crist from the party's base. A Mason-Dixon poll from March/April found that only 23% of Republicans would "definitely" vote for Crist, compared to 18% who would "definitely not". During the first fundraising quarter, Rubio raised a "solid" $250,000 and confirmed that he would likely continue his campaign, regardless of what Crist did. On April 2, Mack announced that he would not run, telling Crist: "I will be your strongest supporter and champion -- regardless of whether you seek re-election or election to the Senate." An article in The Tampa Tribune reported on the growing opposition to Crist, which quoted, among others, former state representative Dennis K. Baxley, who said that the disappointment with Crist was "the kind of disappointment that's going to have people looking in other directions for leaders... the conservative movement needs a strong leader." Former Pinellas County Republican Party Chairman Tony DiMatteo said that Crist was more likely to receive a primary challenge to if he ran for the Senate because: "In Tallahassee, there's a conservative Republican Legislature to balance the governor... A lot of people around the state feel the same way I do. We didn't leave Charlie; Charlie left us." Conversely, Republican consultant Adam Goodman said: "He's looked upon as such a popular and compelling figure that the sky's the limit. There are always going to be people to his right and to his left both in the party and in general. As long as he maintains his anti-tax platform, he'll be fine." Political scientist Darryl Paulson said that "Given Crist's ability to raise substantial amounts of money and his appeal to crossovers and independents, I couldn't name anybody who would have even a reasonable shot at defeating him in a primary."

A surprise entry into the race came on April 9, when former New Hampshire senator Bob Smith entered the race. Smith, who had lost his seat in New Hampshire in 2002, subsequently moved to Florida, and briefly ran for the Senate in 2004. He formally declared his candidacy on June 8. At the end of April, with Crist's decision nearing, he was reported to be a "near-lock" to run for the Senate and, in the wake of moderate Republican senator Arlen Specter of Pennsylvania's switch to the Democrats, speculation began about whether there was "room" in the party for a moderate like Crist.

The National Republican Senatorial Committee Chairman John Cornyn announced the NRSC's endorsement of Charlie Crist.

After widespread speculation that he would resign before the end of his term, Martínez announced that he would do so on August 7, 2009, leaving Crist in the position to appoint a replacement. He requested applications from U.S. Representative Lincoln Díaz-Balart, attorney Bob Martínez (no relation to Mel Martínez or former governor Bob Martinez) and former Florida Attorney General and Secretary of State of Florida James C. Smith. Appointing Díaz-Balart would create a special election for his then-open House seat and it was suggested that this would prove to be a "tempting proposition" for Rubio, who would then drop down to run for the House instead. Rubio's campaign dismissed speculation he would do anything other than run for the Senate and Crist appointed his chief of staff, George LeMieux, to the Senate instead. Democrat Kendrick Meek expressed disappointment, asserting that Crist should have appointed someone qualified rather than one of the top names "in his cell phone." The Democratic Party of Florida issued an email the same day titled, "George LeMieux (R-Cronyism)", echoing the disapproval of Crist's choice, who was the Deputy Attorney General under Crist, and his chief of staff. In December, Lincoln Díaz-Balart and his brother Mario, also a U.S. Representative, withdrew their endorsements of Crist. They declined to reveal the reason why, saying that "the governor knows why we withdrew and he left us with no alternative", although it was suggested that Crist's appointment of LeMieux and his passing over of a prosecutor that Lincoln Díaz-Balart had recommended for a county judgeship in North Florida were the reasons.

Former New Hampshire Senator Bob Smith, who had barely featured in opinion polls, withdrew from the race on March 30, 2010, citing poor fundraising.

After being behind in the polls, Rubio began to cut into Crist's lead, mostly as a reaction to Crist's support of the stimulus bill, which Rubio opposed. Crist subsequently fell behind Rubio by over 20 points. On April 16, Crist's campaign manager, Connie Mack IV, resigned. Ostensibly as a reaction to Crist's veto of a controversial education bill that tied teacher's pay to their students' test scores, Crist's increasingly poor showing in the polls was widely speculated to have been a factor in Mack's decision. Speculation began that Crist would drop out of the Republican primary and run as an Independent before April 30, the Florida filing deadline. Polling showed that although Crist was trailing Rubio considerably in the Republican primary, were he to run as an independent, the three-way race would become more competitive; Rubio was currently leading Meek and Crist in aggregate three-way polling as of June 2010.

On April 28, Crist campaign officials confirmed that Crist would be running as an independent and planned to drop out of the Republican primary.

The primary was held on August 24, 2010. Running virtually unopposed, Rubio won with almost 85% of the vote.

Candidates 
These candidates formally qualified to appear on the Florida Republican primary ballot.
 William Escoffery
 William Billy Kogut, realtor
 Marco Rubio, former Speaker of the Florida House of Representatives
 Marion Thorpe

Endorsements

Polling

Results

Democratic primary

Background 
Many Democratic politicians were mentioned as potential candidates for the race, including U.S. Representatives Allen Boyd, Kathy Castor, Ron Klein, Kendrick Meek, Debbie Wasserman Schultz and Robert Wexler, State Senators Dave Aronberg and Dan Gelber and Mayor of Orlando Buddy Dyer. Alex Sink also reconsidered her decision not to run. Wasserman Schultz and Wexler announced in December 2008 that they would not run.

Meek was the first major candidate of either party to declare his candidacy, on January 13, 2009. After "serious and careful thought", three days later, Sink reiterated her decision to run for re-election. Following her decision, Dan Gelber said that he "had been really waiting for her" and had been "prepared to fully support [her]." He also said that "I expect I'll be entering the race in the coming weeks." On January 27, he declared his candidacy. The following day, Allen Boyd also declined to run. In March, it was reported that while Gelber was "consumed" with the legislative session, Meek was raising money and collecting endorsements, including from former president Bill Clinton. Gelber replied, "Frankly the practicality is, it's just hard to find hours in the day to make phone calls right now." At the end of the first fundraising quarter, Meek reported raising $1.5 million. He also decided to gain ballot access via petitions, rather than paying the standard filing fee. He said that collecting the required 100,000 petitions would "keep me engaged with the people of Florida".

Congressman Kendrick Meek was the first Democrat to declare his intention to run. Upon Chief Financial Officer Alex Sink's decision to run for governor, State Senator Dan Gelber formed an exploratory committee. However, Gelber ultimately decided not to run, so as to avoid a divisive primary. Congressman Meek enlisted the aid of former President Bill Clinton, who hosted a fundraiser for him in Jacksonville. Term limited North Miami mayor Kevin Burns, also announced his candidacy for the Senate seat. On April 30, 2010, Palm Beach billionaire Jeff Greene announced he was running.

The primary took place on August 24, 2010.

Candidates 
These candidates formally qualified to appear on the Florida Democratic primary ballot.
 Glenn A. Burkett
 Maurice Ferré, former mayor of Miami
 Jeff Greene, businessman
 Kendrick Meek, U.S. Representative

Endorsements

Polling

Results

General election

Candidates

Major 
These candidates have gotten at least 5% in pre-election polling
 Charlie Crist (I), governor
 Kendrick Meek (D), U.S. Representative
 Marco Rubio (R), former Speaker of the Florida House of Representatives

Minor 
qualified either by paying filing fee or with the 112,446 signatures to appear on ballot.
 Alexander Snitker (Libertarian)
 Lewis Jerome Armstrong (I)
 Sue Askeland (I)
 Bobbie Bean (I)
 Bernie DeCastro (Constitution)
 Bruce Ray Riggs (I)
 Rick Tyler (I)

Write-ins 
These candidates have qualified for the general election as write-in candidates.
 Piotr Blass
 George Drake
 Howard Knepper
 Carol Ann Joyce LaRosa
 Richard Lock
 Robert Monroe
 Belinda Quarterman-Noah

Campaign 

Charlie Crist argued "If you want somebody on the far right, you get Marco Rubio. If you want someone on the far left, you have Kendrick Meek. If you want someone who will fight for you and apply common sense, you have me."
 Meek argued "Marco Rubio has always been the Tea Party candidate and yesterday Charlie Crist says he wants to crash the Tea Party, too. I'm the only candidate who's fighting for the middle class." Rubio argued "If you like 'Obamacare,' if you like the stimulus plan, you can vote for Charlie Crist or Kendrick Meek."

It was reported that former President Bill Clinton attempted to convince Meek to drop out of the race in October while they campaigned together, as Meek and Crist appeared to be splitting the Democratic vote, allowing Rubio to win.  Meek denied the report.

In the final week of the campaign, an advisor confirmed that Crist would caucus with the Democrats if elected to the Senate.

Debates 
Friday, September 17
WLTV-Univision 23 Debate
Miami, FL

Tuesday, September 28
WTVT-FOX 13 Tampa Bay Debate
Tampa, FL

Wednesday, October 6
ABC News, WFTV-ABC 9 Orlando & WFTS-ABC 28 Tampa
Moderated by George Stephanopoulos and two local media panelists
Orlando, FL

Wednesday, October 20
Leadership Florida Debate
Ft. Lauderdale, FL

Sunday, October 24
CNN/St. Petersburg Times Debate
Moderated by Candy Crowley
Tampa, FL

Tuesday, October 26
NBC News & WESH-NBC 2 Orlando Debate
Moderated by David Gregory
Orlando, FL

Predictions

Polling

Fundraising

Results

References

External links 
 
 Florida Secretary of State - Division of Elections
 U.S. Congress candidates for Florida at Project Vote Smart
 Florida U.S. Senate from OurCampaigns.com
 Campaign contributions from Open Secrets
 2010 Florida Senate Election graph of multiple polls from Pollster.com
 Election 2010: Florida Senate from Rasmussen Reports
 2010 Florida Senate Race from Real Clear Politics
 2010 Florida Senate Race from CQ Politics
 Race profile from The New York Times
Debates
 Florida Senate Democratic Primary Debate on C-SPAN, August 2, 2010
 Florida Senate Democratic Primary Debate on C-SPAN, August 10, 2010
Official campaign websites (archived)
 Charlie Crist for U.S. Senate
 Kendrick Meek for U.S. Senate
 Marco Rubio for U.S. Senate

News stories
 Sen. Mel Martinez resigns; Crist will appoint replacement
 The First Senator From the Tea Party?

United States Senate
Florida
2010
Marco Rubio